Frederick Leach (November 23, 1897 in Springfield, Missouri – December 10, 1981 in Hagerman, Idaho) was a professional baseball player who played outfield in the Major Leagues from 1923 to 1932. He would play for the Philadelphia Phillies, New York Giants, and Boston Braves. He hit .300 or better six times, with a career high of .329 in 1926.

In a ten year career, Leach was in 991 games played, batted .307 (1147-3733), scoring 543 runs and collecting 509 RBI. His on-base percentage was .341 and  slugging percentage was .446.

External links

1897 births
1981 deaths
Major League Baseball outfielders
Baseball players from Missouri
New York Giants (NL) players
Boston Braves players
Philadelphia Phillies players
Sportspeople from Springfield, Missouri